Western Port, (Boonwurrung: Warn Marin) commonly but unofficially known as Western Port Bay, is a large tidal bay in southern Victoria, Australia, opening into Bass Strait. It is the second largest bay in the state. Geographically, it is dominated by two large islands; French Island and Phillip Island. At the time it was renamed, its position was west of other known ports and bays, but Western Port has become something of a misnomer as it lies just to the east of the larger Port Phillip and the city of Melbourne. It is visited by Australian fur seals, whales and dolphins, as well as many migratory waders and seabirds. It is listed under the Ramsar Convention as a wetland of international significance.

The area around the bay and the two main islands were originally part of the Boonwurrung nation's territory prior to European settlement. Western Port was first seen by Europeans in 1798 when an exploration crew in a whaleboat led by George Bass, journeyed south from Sydney to explore Australia's south eastern coastline. Due in most part to a lack of food, the expedition was halted, spending two weeks in Western Port before returning to Sydney. As it was the most westerly charted point at the time, it was named Western Port.

The bay is home to the three Marine National Parks—French Island, Churchill Island and Yaringa, while the land adjacent to the north is largely used for farming purposes including cattle and wineries.  Today the bay is mostly used for recreation; however, there is also a military base (HMAS Cerberus), shipping and oil production facilities adjoining the bay.  Western Port is around one hour from Melbourne by car and a small number of holiday villages with sandy swimming beaches lie on its shores.

History
Prior to European settlement, the Bunurong people lived around Warn Marin living off shellfish, mutton birds and plant life. The bay was first explored by Europeans in 1797, when George Bass received permission from Governor Hunter in Sydney to sail a whaleboat along the unexplored section of coast south of Botany Bay. On such a rough stretch of water, Bass could not get more than halfway through the strait now known as Bass Strait. This voyage led to the recording of Western Port, so named because of its situation relative to every other known harbour on the coast at that time (the area from Point Hicks to Cape Howe), even though it lies to the east of Port Phillip and the city of Melbourne. Seal hunting was conducted here in the 19th century.

Attempted colonisation
In the year 1826 it was reported that the French had resolved to found a settlement at some Australian harbour – probably King George's Sound or Western Port. The British Government at once sent instructions to Sydney for Governor Darling to immediately take possession of these places. They took a number of convicts and a small force composed of detachments of the 3rd and 93rd regiments. The expedition landed at Settlement Point, on the eastern side of the bay near present-day Corinella, which was the headquarters until the abandonment of Western Port at the instance of Governor Darling about twelve months afterwards, as unfit for civilisation,

Samuel Anderson established the third permanent European settlement in Victoria, after Portland and Melbourne, at Bass in 1835.

It was only after the end of World War II that serious consideration was given to the development of the port, and its flat shores north of Stony and Crib Points have become a centre for heavy industry.

Geography
Formerly a major river drainage system, it was inundated together with Port Phillip by the rising sea in the Holocene period; the Western Port sunkland now forms an extensive tidal bay. The waters of Western Port cover an area of 680 km² of which 270 km² are exposed as mud flats at low tide. The topography of Western Port is dominated by two large islands: French Island and Phillip Island. The coastline, including that of the islands, is some 263 km.  The bay and its islands are criss-crossed by seven seismically active fault lines and experiences numerous minor earthquakes every year.

In the northern reaches, several rivers and creeks drain into the bay and flow through extensive mangroves, mudflats and sand banks before being channelled either side of French Island and into the open water in the southern reaches around Phillip Island. Several natural river paths and channels provide access for boats to the northern reaches; however, this is highly dependent on the tides and local knowledge is essential. Some of the major tributaries of Western Port are Bunyip River, Lang Lang River, Bass River, Cardinia Creek, Redbill Creek, Mosquito Creek, Brella Creek and Tankerton Creek.  Until the mid 20th century, the Koo-Wee-Rup Swamp adjoined the bay in the north, covering an area of 30–40 thousand hectares, extending inland to present-day Pakenham, prior to cultivation of the land by early settlers. The mangroves in the northern reaches are the only remnants of this swamp today.

Islands

Western Port contains two large islands and several small ones; in approximate order of size:
 French Island - 170 km² (population: 116)
 Phillip Island - 100 km² (population: 9,000)
Middle Spit - exposed at low tide
 Quail Island
Tortoise Head Bank - exposed at low tide
 Churchill Island - 57 ha
 Chinaman Island
 Elizabeth Island
 Sandstone Island
Reef Island
Long Island
Schnapper Rock
Pelican Island
 Barrallier Island
 Ram Island
 Joe Island

Ecology

Flora
Western Port supports a mosaic of habitat types including underwater seagrass beds, intertidal rock platforms, sandy beaches, intertidal mudflats, tidal channels, saltmarshes and mangroves. The coastline around Phillip Island is of State significance because of its remnant coastal tussock grasslands and dune scrub, a rare vegetation community in Victoria.

Fauna
Western Port consists of rocky platforms, sandy beaches and marine habitats. It is home to a diverse range of invertebrates including colonial ascidians, sponges and corals. Mudflats and mangrove swamps around the northern end of the bay support a large number of invertebrates that are an important food source for waders and visiting migratory birds. French Island is home to migratory waders, Australian pelicans, short-tailed shearwater rookeries, and many other significant fauna species.  The bay has been identified as a 623 km2 Important Bird Area (IBA) by BirdLife International because it regularly supports small numbers of critically endangered orange-bellied parrots, over 1% of the world populations of Far Eastern curlews, red-necked stints and pied oystercatchers, and declining numbers of vulnerable fairy terns.

Phillip Island Penguin Reserve has the largest colony of little penguins in Victoria as well as a major colony of short-tailed shearwaters, with breeding hooded plovers and peregrine falcons. Seal Rock off Phillip Island is home to the largest colony of Australian fur seals and a breeding site of kelp gulls and sooty oystercatchers. San Remo's marine community is a rich assemblage of marine biota listed under the State Flora and Fauna Guarantee Act, 1988. The bay is listed under the Ramsar Convention for its internationally important wetlands.

The Moonlit Sanctuary Wildlife Conservation Park situated near the north western corner of the bay in Pearcedale offers a close up look at some of the indigenous mammals and birds of the region.

In recent years, numbers of whale sightings (mostly southern right and humpback) have increased, and local institutes conduct researches of their presences in the bay along within vicinity to the bay and Port Phillip Bay, asking public to report sightings.

Parklands
Land:
Coolart Wetlands and Homestead Reserve
French Island National Park
Langwarrin Flora and Fauna Reserve
Mornington Peninsula National Park

Marine:
French Island National Park - 2,800ha
Yaringa Marine National Park - 980ha
Churchill Island Marine National Park - 670ha

Recreation
Fishing, pleasure boating and yachting are some of the popular pastimes on the bay.

Recreation on Phillip Island
 Penguin Reserve - visited at dusk to watch the penguins return to their burrows in the sand dunes
 Seal Rocks - viewed through binoculars
 Koala Conservation Centre
Bird watching
Scenic Flights from Philip Island Airport (Located on Cape Woolamai)

Recreation on French Island
Bushwalking or bird observing; bush orchid and fishing areas; horse riding, bike rides, and deep water fishing
Koala habitat
Camping

Shipping and boating
Deep channels lead from Bass Strait into the western section of the bay, giving access to the region's port facilities. The town of Hastings is the main boat landing in the bay with the Yaringa Marina at Somerville also offering boat harbor facilities.

There are boat launching ramps at:
Stony Point  -Concrete 3 lane ramp, 2 holding jetties, All Tides
Blind Bight  -Tarmac Single lane ramp, Holding Jetty, High Tide
Corinella  -Concrete 2 lane ramp, 2 Holding jetties, All Tides
Hastings  - Concrete 4 lane ramp, Holding Jetty, All Tides
There are also ramps at Tooradin, Newhaven, Cowes, Warneet, Lang Lang, Grantville, Flinders, and Rhyll (Phillip Island).

A ferry runs between Cowes, Tankerton And Stony Point at certain times ( Check timetable at destinations) during the year.

Accommodation is available on both Phillip Island and French Island.

The boundary between the coastal waters of Bass Strait and the enclosed waters of Western Port is defined on the western side by a line from West Head on the Mornington Peninsula to Black Rock, Phillip Island. Then from Black Rock to the tip of Point Grant at The Nobbies on Phillip Island. On the eastern side, it's a line from the southeastern tip of Cape Woolami, Phillip Island to Griffiths Point on the Bass Coast. Source: Western Port Recreational Boating Guide: sixth edition, June 2021.

Coast Guard Flotillas
 Coast Guard Western Port

Industry
Western Port has several industrial complexes, including a BlueScope steel processing works and the major Royal Australian Navy training base, HMAS Cerberus. Holden Australia's proving ground is located just east of Western Port. The Westernport Oil Refinery was operated by BP at Crib Point from 1966 to 1985.

Current development plans for the Port at Hastings would see it become the major shipping port for container and bulk freight in and out of Victoria. Substantial opposition to the development has been raised by local communities concerned with the scale of the development and its impact upon the fragile ecosystem of the bay. Blue Wedges and Preserve Westernport Action Group provide a voice for many of the objections raised by concerned locals.

Regulations
For the protection of the marine environment, a number of activities are prohibited within the boundaries of Victoria's Marine National Parks and Marine Sanctuaries. No fishing, netting, spearing, taking or killing of marine life. All methods of fishing, from the shore or sea, are prohibited. No taking or damaging of animals, plants and objects or artefacts. There are strong penalties under the National Parks Act for fishing in Marine National Parks and Sanctuaries. All offenses can by reported to the Department of Primary Industries.

However, you may carry fin-fish on board your boat within park boundaries if you caught the fish outside the parks and you may also carry but not use, a fishing rod or spear gun. You may also have abalone or rock lobster associated equipment on board the boat provided that you are travelling straight through the park by the shortest practicable route.

See also
Mornington Peninsula and Western Port Biosphere Reserve

References

External links
Phillip Island Guide
Corinella information
French Island and Phillip Island Ferry
Seal Rock Cruises
Moonlit Sanctuary Wildlife Conservation Park

 
Mornington Peninsula
Ramsar sites in Australia
Bays of Victoria (Australia)
Important Bird Areas of Victoria (Australia)
Seal hunting